Christian Madsen (born 1869) was an American politician who served as a Socialist member of the Illinois House of Representatives from 1913 to 1917.

Biographical Sketch
Madsen was born in Denmark in 1869. He was educated at Royal Danish Academy of Fine Arts. He immigrated to the United States in 1892, settling in the Humboldt Park neighborhood of Chicago. A painter and decorator by trade, he served as secretary of the largest local union of Painters, Decorators and Paperhangers in America, Local Union No. 194.

In the 1912 general election for the Illinois House of Representatives, four socialists were elected and three were seated. The other seated socialists were Joseph Mason and Seymour Stedman. In 1914, Mason was reelected to a second and final term.

References

Members of the Illinois House of Representatives
Socialist Party of America politicians from Illinois
1869 births
Date of death missing